The canton of Mourmelon-Vesle et Monts de Champagne is an administrative division of the Marne department, northeastern France. It was created at the French canton reorganisation which came into effect in March 2015. Its seat is in Mourmelon-le-Grand.

It consists of the following communes:
 
Aubérive
Baconnes
Beaumont-sur-Vesle
Bétheniville
Billy-le-Grand
Bouy
Chigny-les-Roses
Dampierre-au-Temple
Dontrien
Époye
Livry-Louvercy
Ludes
Mailly-Champagne
Montbré
Mourmelon-le-Grand
Mourmelon-le-Petit
Les Petites-Loges
Pontfaverger-Moronvilliers
Prosnes
Rilly-la-Montagne
Saint-Hilaire-au-Temple
Saint-Hilaire-le-Petit
Saint-Martin-l'Heureux
Saint-Masmes
Saint-Souplet-sur-Py
Selles
Sept-Saulx
Trépail
Vadenay
Val-de-Vesle
Vaudemange
Vaudesincourt
Verzenay
Verzy
Ville-en-Selve
Villers-Allerand
Villers-Marmery

References

Cantons of Marne (department)